Karol Pecze (born 7 February 1946) is a Slovak football manager. 

He coached MŠK Žilina, Slovan Bratislava, FK DAC 1904 Dunajská Streda, Győri ETO FC, FC Nitra, Wisla Kraków, Spartak Trnava, 1. FC Košice, Gençlerbirliği, Çaykur Rizespor, Inter Bratislava, Panionios, Sivasspor.

Honours

Manager
Slovan Bratislava
Czechoslovak Cup (1): 1981-82
Slovak Cup (2): 1982, 1983

DAC Dunajská Streda
1. SNL: Winners: 1984-85 (Promoted) 
Czechoslovak Cup (1): 1986-87
Czechoslovak First League: Third place 1987-88

Spartak Trnava
Slovak Cup: Runners-up: 1995-96
Slovak Super Liga: Runners-up: 1996-97

References

External links
Profile at TFF.org

Czechoslovak football managers
Slovak football managers
Slovak expatriate football managers
FC DAC 1904 Dunajská Streda managers
ŠK Slovan Bratislava managers
Győri ETO FC managers
FC Spartak Trnava managers
FC VSS Košice managers
Gençlerbirliği S.K. managers
Wisła Kraków managers
MŠK Žilina managers
Expatriate football managers in Poland
Slovak expatriate sportspeople in Poland
FC Nitra managers
1946 births
Living people
Sportspeople from Košice
Slovak expatriate sportspeople in Turkey
Czechoslovak expatriate sportspeople in Hungary
Slovak expatriate sportspeople in Greece
Czechoslovak expatriate football managers
Expatriate football managers in Hungary
Expatriate football managers in Turkey
Expatriate football managers in Greece